Vel's Parnelli Jones Racing, commonly referred to simply as Parnelli or VPJ, was a motor racing constructor and team from the United States. The team was formed in 1969 by former USAC racer Parnelli Jones and his business partner Velko "Vel" Miletich. Parnelli was initially solely concerned with USAC racing, where success came quickly; their driver Al Unser won the Indianapolis 500 race in 1970, driving a VPJ Colt, after leading 190 of the 200 racing laps.  Unser went on to win the USAC championship.  Unser repeated the Indy 500 win in 1971 with a new Colt built without the left side chassis offset that had been made illegal by 1971 rules, ending the season in fourth place in the USAC drivers points while teammate Joe Leonard won the championship.

Racing

Parnelli secured the services of ex-Team Lotus designer Maurice Philippe and driver Mario Andretti for USAC racing in the early 1970s, and in 1974 decided to move into Formula One racing, with financial support from tire manufacturer Firestone. Their Parnelli VPJ4 car owed much to Philippe's Lotus 72 design. It appeared for the North American races at the end of the 1974 season and was gradually developed through 1975. However, Firestone's decision to quit racing at the end of 1974 meant that a major partner was lost. Jones was unable to find a replacement title sponsor and despite improvements made to the car the team folded only three races into the  season. Andretti only learned of the Formula One team's future from journalist Chris Economaki, as he sat in the car on the grid for the Long Beach Grand Prix. This led to some bad feeling between Andretti and Jones, and Andretti returned to Lotus for the remainder of the season. In total, Vel's Parnelli Jones participated in 16 Grands Prix and scored 6 championship points.

Concurrent with the Formula One venture, VPJ was developing a turbocharged version of Cosworth's legendary DFV V8 Formula One engine, building on their experience from the previous two years. It was developed at their facility in Torrance, California, under the direction of engine builder Larry Slutter and dyno engineer "Chickie" Hirashima.  The car debuted at the Speedway in 1975 in a modified Indy version of the Formula One Parnelli chassis, although it was not run regularly until late in 1976. This private project was quickly adopted by Cosworth itself, and the Parnelli engine evolved into the equally legendary Cosworth DFX, an engine which would go on to win every Indianapolis 500 race and USAC/CART Championship between 1978 and 1987.

IndyCar champions

Indianapolis 500 victories

Complete Formula One results
(key)

Non-Championship results
(key)

References

 Lyons, P. 2007. Keeping up with the Jones. Motor Sport. LXXXIII/1 (January 2007), 52-59

External links
VPJ Racing Collection Website

Parnelli
Formula One entrants
American auto racing teams
American racecar constructors
1969 establishments in the United States